Leucorhynchia minor is a species of sea snail, a marine gastropod mollusk in the family Skeneidae.

Description
The length of the shell attains 2.55 mm.

Distribution
This species occurs in the Atlantic Ocean off São Tomé Island.

References

 Rolán E. & Gori S. (2013) A new species of the genus Leucorhynchia (Gastropoda, Turbinidae) from São Tomé Island, Guinean Gulf, West Africa. Gloria Maris 52(5): 128–132

External links

minor
Gastropods described in 2013
Invertebrates of São Tomé and Príncipe
Fauna of São Tomé Island